Stepanovka is a rural locality (a village) in Vozdvizhensky Selsoviet, Alsheyevsky District, Bashkortostan, Russia. The population was 34 as of 2010. There are two streets.

Geography 
Stepanovka is located 44 km southwest of Rayevsky (the district's administrative centre) by road. Sanatoriya imeni Chekhova is the nearest rural locality. It has an area of 0.13 km2.

References 

Rural localities in Alsheyevsky District